The Flying Dutchman is a Dutch planing sailing dinghy that was designed by Uus Van Essen and Conrad Gülcher as a high performance, one design racer and first built in 1951.

The boat was an Olympic sailing class from 1960 until 1992.

Production
The boat was built in the past by Sunbeam Yachts, Alpa Yachts, Mader Bootswerft, MacKay Boats, Plastrend/Composite Technologies, Lanaverre, Lockley Newport Boats, Advance Sailboat Corp., Binks Yacht Contructions, Chantier Naval Costantini and Mobjack Manufacturing, starting in 1951. More than 10,000 have been built. In 2022 Mader Bootswerft were still producing the design.

Design

The Flying Dutchman is a racing sailboat, initially built of wood, with many modern boats made from fiberglass sandwich construction with a plastic deck. Cold-molded plywood is still used and some sailers prefer that material.

The boat has a fractional sloop rig, a spooned raked stem, a plumb transom, a transom-hung rudder controlled by a tiller and a retractible centerboard. Modern boats may have plastic rudders and centerboards. It displaces .

The boat has many adjustable settings available while sailing, including the genoa halyard, shroud tension and the mast rake. The crew can use a trapeze to balance the boat.

The design has a Portsmouth Yardstick D-PN of 82.6 and a RYA PN of 879.

Operational history
The boat is supported by an active class club that organizes racing events, the International Flying Dutchman Class Organization.

The Flying Dutchman was an Olympic sailing class in double-handed dinghies from 1960 until 1992.

Due to its complexity, the design's cost has been a barrier to its wider acceptance.	

A Classic Sailboats review noted that "the 'fastest double-handed dinghy in the world' made its Olympic debut in Naples in 1960. It was based on the new go-fast concept of a trapezing crew and a large spinnaker. The ideal crewman should be tall, heavy, nimble and smart – not a simple recipe to follow. The FD has a long waterline and normally planes on the beat. But the large genoa jib makes tacking slow. Pure boatspeed is thus the key ingredient for success."

The United States Sailing Association describes the boat as "one of the most exhilarating dinghies you will ever be in."

Racing

Boats on display
National Maritime Museum, Greenwich, England

See also
List of sailing boat types

Related development
International FJ

References

External links 

Mader Bootswerft official page
Flying Dutchman - International Sailing Federation

 
Classes of World Sailing
Dinghies
Olympic sailing classes
Two-person sailboats
1950s sailboat type designs
Sailboat type designs by Uus Van Essen
Sailboat type designs by Conrad Gülcher
Sailboat types built by Newport Boats
Sailboat types built by Sunbeam Yachts
Sailboat types built by Alpa Yachts
Sailboat types built by Mader Bootswerft
Sailboat types built by MacKay Boats
Sailboat types built by Plastrend/Composite Technologies
Sailboat types built by Lanaverre
Sailboat types built by Advance Sailboat Corp
Sailboat types built by Binks Yacht Contructions
Sailboat types built by Chantier Naval Costantini
Sailboat types built by Mobjack Manufacturing